Regius Professor of Astronomy may refer to:
 Regius Professor of Astronomy (Edinburgh), at the University of Edinburgh
 Regius Professor of Astronomy (Glasgow), at the University of Glasgow